Larry Donovan (born March 31, 1941) is a former head football coach for the Montana Grizzlies and BC Lions. Donovan's coaching career spanned 52 years, working with teams in the United States, Canada, and Japan.

Early life 
Donovan was born in Casper, Wyoming on March 31, 1941. Father Bill was working as a ranch hand and cowboy while mother Mary was the ranch cook. He grew up with one sibling, sister Jean Ingrum, born in California.

Donovan was an active youth, helping relatives with farm work as a boy. The family moved to Scottsbluff, Nebraska in 1945. There, Donovan's physicality translated to athletic success when he started pole vaulting and setting records in junior high. He participated in other sports, including Golden Gloves (amateur boxing), baseball, and basketball. Donovan attended Scottsbluff High School where he lettered in football, basketball, and track. He set a state record for pole vault in 1959 when he won a gold medal as an elite athlete in the country for his age group. Donovan finished his Bearcats sports career with a trip to the Shrine Bowl in 1959 and was all-state in football the year he graduated. Along with the awards and accolades he won as an athlete, Donovan was VP of student council.

Part of Donovan's legacy in Scottsbluff is the Conner-Madden Memorial Scholarship. Donovan helped establish this fund in memory of his high school football coach, Bill Conner, and longtime sports writer for the Star-Herald, Bill Madden. The annual award is given to graduating seniors in Scottsbluff to apply toward post-secondary learning.

College years 
Out of high school, Donovan was offered a football scholarship to play for the University of Nebraska Cornhuskers. He started three of four eligible years, sitting his junior year due to an injury. The Cornhuskers made it to the Gotham Bowl in 1962, the same year Donovan was voted Most Eligible Bachelor. Donovan also ran track for the university, lettering both as a football player and pole vaulter.

During college, Donovan was an active part of the student body. He pledged Phi Kappa Psi fraternity and became VP of the organization and was president of the N-Club. Politically, he was involved with the Young Democrats, where he was Vice President of the local club.

Donovan graduated from the University of Nebraska in 1964 with a Bachelor of Education. He also has a Masters in educational administration +30 from the University of South Dakota.

Military career 
Donovan began his military career when he joined the ROTC in college. Following graduation, he was a commissioned second lieutenant in the US Army. He served two years of active duty in Oklahoma and Korea. While in Korea, Donovan served as Forward Artillery in the DMZ, receiving an Army commendation medal for his service; he was also co-coach and player for the undefeated champions of the 2nd infantry division in 1966. During his time in Fort Sill, Oklahoma and Fort Chaffe, Arkansas, Donovan was Battery Commander. When he was coaching in South Dakota, Donovan also served with the National Guard.

Playing and coaching career 
A 1964 graduate of the University of Nebraska, Donovan served as an assistant at South Dakota, Washington State, Iowa, and Kansas before becoming Montana's head coach on December 15, 1979.

In his six seasons as head coach of the Grizzlies, Donovan had a  record and only one winning season. On November 25, 1985, athletic director Harley Lewis announced that the contracts of Donovan and eight of his assistants would not be renewed. Donovan believed that he had been unjustly fired and blamed the antiquated Dornblaser Field for his lack of success in recruiting. His requests for a new stadium resulted in the construction of Washington–Grizzly Stadium, which opened in 1986.

Donovan's next coaching job was as the defensive line coach for the BC Lions. On October 30, 1987, head coach Don Matthews was fired and Donovan was named interim head coach. The Lions went 4–0 after the coaching change and finished the season in first place in the West Division, falling to the eventual Grey Cup champion Edmonton Eskimos in the West Final game. In 1988, his first and only full season as head coach, the Lions had a 10–8 record and made it to the Grey Cup, losing to the Winnipeg Blue Bombers 22–21. The Lions struggled in 1989 and Donovan was fired after an 0–4 start.

Donovan was an assistant coach for the Saskatchewan Roughriders in 1990 and 1991. He traveled to Japan to coach the Japanese X League Hurricanes sponsored by Hitachi Limited and Renesas Technologies from 1992 until 2007. He was a training camp coach and consultant for the Asahi Beverage Challengers in Osaka, Japan in 2010.

Head coaching record

College

Donovan started his coaching career while still at the University of Nebraska in 1964, where he was a graduate assistant. That was the year the Cornhuskers went to the Orange Bowl in Miami, defeating the Auburn Tigers 13–7. Donovan has been a member of the National Coaches Association since 1969.

Across more than 50 years of coaching in the US, Canada, and Japan, Donovan was mentored by and mentored a number of well-known and successful football coaches and players:

 Bob Devaney
 Carl Selmer
 Monte Kiffen
 Warren Powers
 Tom Osborne
 Joe Salem
 Jim Sweeney
 Bob Cummings
 Don Fambrough
 Kent Stephenson
 Andre Patterson
 Dennis Green
 Don Matthews
 Joe Glenn
 Marty Mornhinwig
 Mike Van Diest
 Ken Flajole
 Tom Dimitroff

Japan 
In 1992, Donovan was head-hunted by sports agent and entrepreneur Gordon Campbell to act as Head Coach in charge of team development for the Hitachi Hurricanes, a team playing in the X League in Japan. This was the start of a 21-year overseas career that saw Donovan splitting his time between the west coast of North America and the Tokyo area. Donovan worked with Koike San, the general manager of the Hitachi Hurricanes Football Club. The team learned about American-style football under the tutelage of Donovan and became US-Japan champs in Division 2. While in Japan, Donovan also worked with the Yokota Air Force Base high school football team as a coach consultant from 1993 to 2008. Even after he stopped spending eight months of the year in Japan, Donovan returned for clinics and special guest coach appearances until 2016.

Community and philanthropic work 
Donovan has always been involved with local charities, fundraisers, and programs. During his collegiate coaching career, he served each campus community, town, and state. Donovan maintained weekly media meetings to make the football programs accessible, and to foster a positive association with the universities. He was committed to fundraising and school promotion, building relationships with alumni and fans. This work continued through his time in the CFL and Japan. From 1992 to 2008, Larry spoke to 389 teams and 18,872 Japanese athletes, sharing his vast knowledge and motivating many young players.

Community involvement highlights:

 Career development speaker, 304th Military Intelligence battalion in 2003 at Fort Huachuca, Arizona
 US Army certificate of Appreciation for Civilian Services in Montana
 United Way Board, Montana
 Celebrity Support for the Bob Hahn ALS fundraiser in Lincoln, NE
 Blaine, Washington Scholarship board
 Council Member, S t. Anne Catholic Church
 Whatcom County Thanksgiving Basket Project committee member
 Blaine, Washington Food Bank volunteer
 Blaine, Washington Clothing Bank volunteer

Personal life 
In 1966, Donovan married college sweetheart Georgia Merriam in Lincoln, Nebraska. Merriam was an original University of Nebraska pom-pom cheerleader and Miss Nebraska Universe in 1964. She earned a BS from the University of Nebraska and went on to get an MA from the University of Iowa. Together, the couple have three daughters: Andrea, Molly, and Lindsay. The Donovans live in the Pacific Northwest where both are involved in their local community.

References

1941 births
Living people
American football ends
BC Lions coaches
Iowa Hawkeyes football coaches
Kansas Jayhawks football coaches
Montana Grizzlies football coaches
Nebraska Cornhuskers football players
People from Scottsbluff, Nebraska
Players of American football from Nebraska
Saskatchewan Roughriders coaches
South Dakota Coyotes football coaches
Washington State Cougars football coaches
Educators from Nebraska